A contorniate, or contourniate, is a type of ancient Roman medal or medallion of bronze issued in the fourth and fifth centuries CE, having a deep furrow on the contour or edge, as if the object had been turned in a lathe.  The extant contorniates show portraits of various earlier emperors (especially Nero and Trajan) or of cultural figures such as Homer, Solon, Euclid, Pythagoras, Socrates, Sallust, Apollonius Tyaneus, and Apuleius, as well as athletes, whose victories are symbolized by palm leaves and chariots, either bigae or quadrigae. The medals were not used as currency, but may have been distributed as New Year's gifts in association with public spectacles, including chariot races and pantomime.

References

External links
Stefan Krmnicek (ed): Medaillons und Kontorniaten. Antike Sonderprägungen aus der Münzsammlung des Instituts für Klassische Archäologie der Universität Tübingen. In: Von Krösus bis zu König Wilhelm, Neue Serie. Band 1, 2016, a collection catalog from the University of Tübingen (fully available online as PDF), which contains material on contorniates.

Ancient Roman culture
Ancient Greece
Award items
Exonumia